The Audi Type D was introduced in 1911. The vehicle had a four-cylinder in-line engine with 4.7 litres of displacement. It developed 45 PS over a four-speed countershaft gearbox and a propeller shaft, which drove the rear wheels. The car had a ladder frame and two leaf-sprung solid axles. The Type D was available as a four-seat touring car or four-door sedan. Until 1920, only 53 copies of the car were built.

Sources

 Schrader, Halwart: Deutsche Autos 1885-1920, Motorbuch Verlag Stuttgart, 1. Auflage (2002), 

Type D
Cars introduced in 1912
1920s cars